Richard Thomas Mabey (born 20 February 1941) is a writer and broadcaster, chiefly on the relations between nature and culture.

Education
Mabey was educated at three independent schools, all in Berkhamsted, Hertfordshire. The first was at Rothesay School, followed by Berkhamsted Preparatory School and then Berkhamsted School. He then went to St Catherine's College at the University of Oxford where he read Philosophy, Politics and Economics.

Life and work
After Oxford, Mabey worked as a lecturer in Social Studies in Further Education at Dacorum College, Hemel Hempstead, then as a senior editor at Penguin Books. He became a full-time writer in 1974. He spent most of his life among the beechwoods of the Chilterns. He now lives in the Waveney Valley in Norfolk, with his partner Polly Lavender, and retreats to a boat on the Norfolk Broads.

He appeared in a 1975 episode of the BBC Television series The World About Us, "In Deepest Britain", with John Gooders and other naturalists, giving an unscripted narration of the wildlife observed during a country walk. He wrote and presented later episodes of the series, including "The Unofficial Countryside" (1975), "The Flowering of Britain" (1980) and "A Prospect of Kew", about Kew Gardens (1981). "The Unofficial Countryside" and "The Flowering of Britain" were based on his books of the same names. He also wrote and narrated the 1996 BBC television series Postcards from the Country, for whose eight, 40-minute episodes he was series producer, as well as being the producer-director on four. The book of the series Postcards from the Country: living memories of the British countryside (by Peter Marren and Mike Birkhead) includes a foreword by Mabey. "White Rock, Black Water" (1985) was a specially-written epidote of the series The Natural World, about the limestone country of the Yorkshire Dales, and a Channel 4 eight-part series – Back to the Roots – explored the role of plants in Britain's contemporary culture. In the 1990s he often appeared on the BBC's Country File.

Between 1982 and 1986 he sat on the UK government's advisory body, the Nature Conservancy Council. Mabey writes regularly for The Guardian, the New Statesman, The Times and Granta. A selection of these writings was compiled as the book Country Matters. He has written a personal column in BBC Wildlife magazine since 1984, and a selection of these columns has been published as A Brush with Nature.

Between 2000 and 2002 Mabey suffered from depression, and his book Nature Cure, describing his experiences and recovery in the context of man's relationship with landscape and nature, was short-listed for three major literary awards: the Whitbread Biography of the Year, the Royal Society of Literature's Ondaatje Prize for evoking the spirit of place and the J. R. Ackerley Prize for Autobiography.

He has edited and introduced editions of Richard Jefferies, Gilbert White, Flora Thompson and Peter Matthiessen. His contributions to BBC radio include "The Scientist and the Romantic", a series of five essays on his lifelong relationship with science and the natural environment broadcast in The Essay on Radio 3 in 2009, and Changing Climates, on our everyday experience of living with the weather, in 2013. Mabey was the first president of the London Wildlife Trust and later a vice-president; Mabey's Meadow, named for him by the London Wildlife Trust, was one of his favourite haunts, and is described in his book The Unofficial Countryside (1974). It provides the only access to Frays Island in the River Colne.

Awards and distinctions

Mabey has been awarded two Leverhulme Fellowships, and honorary doctorates by St Andrews, Essex and East Anglia for his contributions to nature writing. He was awarded a Civil List Pension in 2008 for services to literature. He was elected a Fellow of the Royal Society of Literature in 2011. He is a Trustee of the arts and conservation charity Common Ground, vice-president of the Open Spaces Society, Patron of the John Clare Society and President of the Waveney and Blythe Arts.

His life of Gilbert White won the 1986 Whitbread Biography of the Year. His Flora Britannica won the British Book Awards' Illustrated Book of the Year and the Botanical Society of the British Isles' President's Award, and was runner-up for the BP Natural World Book Prize.

He was a guest on the BBC Radio 4 programme Desert Island Discs in 1997.

Portraits

The National Portrait Gallery has a 1984 bromide print of Richard Mabey by Mark Gerson. Mabey sat for sculptor Jon Edgar in Norfolk during 2007, as part of the Environment Triptych (2008) along with Mary Midgley and James Lovelock.

Bibliography 

 
 
 
 
 
 
  (with Francesca Greenoak)
 
 
  
 
  (with Michael McIntyre)
 
 
  (with illustrations by Clare Roberts)
  - photography by Gareth Lovett Jones
 
 
 
  (co-author)

Contributions 

  (Editor)
  (Editor)
  (Editor)
 
Class (ed.), 1968
The Natural History of Selborne (ed.), Penguin, 1977
In Search of Food (with David Mabey) 
Cold Comforts, 1983
Second Nature (ed.), 1984
NHS Everyman (ed.), 1993
Landscape with Figures: an anthology of Richard Jeffries (ed.), 1986-9
The Oxford Book of Nature Writing, 1995
The Yorkshire Dales (with landscape photographer Graham Nobles) 
The Garden of Weeds, 2010

Introductions and forewords 

The Snow Leopard, Peter Matthiessen, Viking Press, 1978,  
 
The Tree: A Celebration of Our Living Skyline, edited by Peter Wood, David & Charles, 1993, 
 
An Exaltation of Skylarks, compiled by Stewart Beer, SMH Books, (1995), 
Lark Rise to Candleford (2009 edition)

Educational and children's books
Pop Process (Hutchinson 1969)
Behind the Scene
Food
Children in Primary School
 
Oak and Co.

Films

 Postcards from the Country, BBC, 1996
 Richard Mabey's 2011 "Botanical Busk" tour (of the London canals, commissioned by the Floating Cinema)

Radio 

 The Essay: "The Scientist and the Romantic", BBC Radio 3 (5 episodes, 2009)
 Mabey in the Wild, BBC Radio 4 (2 series, 2011-)
 The Essay: "Changing Climates", BBC Radio 3 (5 episodes, 2013)

References

External links 

 

1941 births
English environmentalists
English nature writers
Fellows of the Royal Society of Literature
Living people
People educated at Berkhamsted School
Alumni of St Catherine's College, Oxford